Richard Sewu (born 11 March 1996) is a Ghanaian footballer.  He currently plays for Mbabane Swallows F.C.

Career
Sewu has played in his native Ghana for Mighty Jets FC, Yeji Juventus FC. He joined Sporting Miren in 2016.

In July 2017, he signed a one-year contract with Mbabane Swallows F.C. of Swaziland.

External links
 Finalball profile
 Ghanaian Players Inter-clubs CAF Competition
  Zesco United VS Mbabane Swallows CAF Competition Lineup
BIRDS IN FOREIGN QUOTA DILEMMA

References

Ghanaian footballers
1996 births
Living people
Mbabane Swallows players
Association football defenders